The Downriver Stars were a minor professional ice hockey team based out of Trenton, Michigan, as member of the All-American Hockey League.

The Stars were rebranded as the Michigan Stars for the 1987–88 AAHL season, but after 14 games and a 2–12 record, the Michigan Stars folded midseason on November 30, 1987. This led to establishment of the Johnstown Chiefs that started play in January 1988 to take their place by Joe Selenski, John Daley, and Henry Brabham.

Regular season

References

All-American Hockey League teams
Defunct ice hockey teams in the United States
Ice hockey clubs disestablished in 1987
Ice hockey clubs established in 1986
1986 establishments in Michigan
1987 disestablishments in Michigan
Ice hockey teams in Michigan
Sports in Wayne County, Michigan